Gibson Kirke Turton (29 July 1841 – 3 July 1891) was a New Zealand barrister who was Provincial Solicitor of Otago, as well as a first-class cricketer who played six matches for Otago in the 1860s and 1870s. He was a native of Raglan.

Personal life
Turton married a daughter of the Hon. J. B. Bathgate, and they had six children. However, he took to alcohol, lost his position and left his family. He wandered in various parts of New Zealand and Australia, and died semi-destitute in Wellington.

See also
 List of Otago representative cricketers

References 

1841 births
1891 deaths
New Zealand cricketers
Otago cricketers
People from Raglan, New Zealand
19th-century New Zealand lawyers